This is a list of electoral results for the Electoral district of Elizabeth in South Australian state elections.

Members for Elizabeth

Election results

Elections in the 2020s

Elections in the 2010s

Elections in the 2000s

Elections in the 1990s 

 Cotton ran under the banner "Independent - Parent Democracy in State Schools".

Elections in the 1980s

Elections in the 1970s

References

SA elections archive: Antony Green ABC
2002 SA election: Antony Green ABC

South Australian state electoral results by district